Veronica tetragona, synonym Hebe tetragona, is a subalpine plant of the family Plantaginaceae, which is endemic to New Zealand.

Veronica tetragona can grow up to 1 metre high and has very small, yellow-green leaves that completely surround the stem. White flowers are produced during summer. The plant gets its name from its distinctive four-sided branches.

Two subspecies were accepted by Plants of the World Online, :
Veronica tetragona subsp. subsimilis (Colenso) Garn.-Jones, syn. Veronica subsimilis – north island of New Zealand
Veronica tetragona subsp. tetragona – throughout New Zealand

References

tetragona
Flora of New Zealand